This is a list of fictional characters appearing in the 2012—2013 Kamen Rider series , including the title character, his allies, and enemies.

Main characters

Haruto Soma
 is a misunderstood former soccer player and one of several individuals who possess the potential to perform magic, or Gates, who abandoned his dream of going pro after injuring his best friend and teammate, Kazuya, during a tryout. Due to his status as a Gate, Sou Fueki kidnapped Soma and several others like him and subjected them to the Sabbath ritual in a failed attempt to revive his deceased daughter, Koyomi. While the ritual created Phantoms instead, Soma was able to stop his inner Phantom, WizarDragon, from turning him through force of will and became part of a small group of survivors who unlocked their magical capabilities as a result. Immediately afterward, Fueki assumed the identity of the White Wizard and gave Soma the means to become Kamen Rider Wizard, tasking him with combating the Phantoms and looking after Koyomi. Motivated by a desire to provide hope to people who have fallen into despair and now finding mundane life boring, Soma takes up residence in the antiques shop Omokagedō to gain more Wizard Rings to bolster his powers and christens himself a Kamen Rider, though he finds solace in his love of doughnuts and frequents the Donut Shop Hungry to satiate this desire. As of the Kamen Rider Wizard tie-in novel, Haruto married friend and ally, Rinko Daimon.

Soma can also alternate between varying  forms via other transformation-type Wizard Rings, which are as follows:
: Wizard's ruby-themed default form accessed from the  Ring, which grants pyromancy and balanced physical capabilities.
: A sapphire-themed auxiliary form accessed from the  Ring that grants aquamancy, proficiency in underwater combat, and moderately increased speed compared to Flame Style.
: An emerald-themed auxiliary form accessed from the  Ring that reduces Wizard's offensive capabilities, but grants aeromancy, proficiency in aerial combat, and increased speed and agility.
: A yellow citrine-themed auxiliary form accessed from the  Ring that reduces Wizard's speed and agility, but grants geomancy and increased strength and durability.
: A special form accessed from Kamen Rider Beast's Falco and Buffa Rings. This form appears exclusively in the Hyper Battle DVD special Showtime with the Dance Ring.

Soma can also access WizarDragon's power to enhance his Styles into Dragon forms, which allow him to manifest one or more of WizarDragon's body parts via the  Ring and perform the  finisher.
: An enhanced version of Flame Style accessed from the Flame Dragon Ring. Using the Special Ring in this form manifests the chest-mounted , which allows Wizard to perform the  finisher.
: An enhanced version of Water Style accessed from the Water Dragon Ring.
: An enhanced version of Hurricane Style accessed from the Hurricane Dragon Ring.
: An enhanced version of Land Style accessed from the Land Dragon Ring. Using the Special Ring in this form manifests the twin , which allow Wizard to perform the  finisher when used in conjunction with the  Ring.
: An enhanced version of Flame Dragon Style accessed from the  brace, which allows Wizard to summon copies of his other Dragon forms, that grants the use of enhanced versions of WizarDragon's body parts all at once.
: A special form accessed from the eponymous Wizard Ring that allows Wizard to utilize "Rush" versions of WizarDragon's body parts. This form appears exclusively in the film Kamen Rider × Kamen Rider Wizard & Fourze: Movie War Ultimatum.
: An enhanced version of Infinity Style accessed from the  Ring that grants the use of golden versions of WizarDragon's body parts. This form appears exclusively in the film Kamen Rider Wizard in Magic Land.
: An enhanced version of Infinity Dragon Style accessed from the Finish Strike Ring enhanced by the  Ring. This form first appears in the film Kamen Rider × Kamen Rider Gaim & Wizard: The Fateful Sengoku Movie Battle.

WizarDragon
, or simply , is Haruto's non-anthropomorphic inner Phantom who is usually summoned to battle inner Phantoms in a Gate's Underworld. Originally hostile towards Soma, Dragon becomes impressed by the human's intent and later allows Soma to fully utilize his power.

In battle, WizarDragon can fly, produce fire breath, and transform into a giant foot to assist Soma in destroying inner Phantoms. During the events of the film Kamen Rider × Super Sentai × Space Sheriff: Super Hero Taisen Z, WizarDragon is able to combine with the Kyoryugers' mecha Kyoryuzin to form  and perform the  finisher.

WizarDragon is voiced by  while his human form is portrayed by Shunya Shiraishi, who also portrays Haruto Soma.

Koyomi
Despite placing the Philosopher's Stone in her body, he succeeded in half-resurrecting her and entrusts Soma with protecting her and giving her periodic infusions of magical energy to maintain her state of being. Initially possessing no memory of what happened to her, she resents her half-dead state and wishes she was properly dead, though Soma slowly convinces Koyomi to have hope in him, be more accepting of her circumstances, and work towards the future. While in Soma's care, she lives in Shigeru Wajima's antiques shop and assists Soma with her ability to detect disguised Phantoms. Koyomi eventually learns the truth of what happened to her before Sora Takigawa rips the Philosopher's Stone out of her body, killing her once more. After defeating Takigawa, Soma takes the Philosopher's Stone and travels the world in the hopes of hiding it and preventing it being misused any further, eventually finding an ideal place in the form of his own Underworld's Koyomi. In the Kamen Rider Wizard tie-in novel, Haruto and Rinko have a daughter and name her Koyomi in memory of their deceased friend. 

Rinko Daimon
 is a rookie detective at the Metropolitan Police Department's  with an Edokko upbringing who joined the police force to help people like her father had. After being targeted by the Phantom, Minotauros, and nearly succumbing to her inner Phantom, Jabberwock, she gets caught up in the battle between Haruto Soma and the Phantoms and provides support to the former through her police work. As of the Kamen Rider Wizard tie-in novel, Rinko married Haruto and has a daughter named Koyomi with him.

Shunpei Nara
 is a clumsy young man who has been fascinated with magic ever since he read the picture book , even going so far as to quote the wizard's magic phrase  and attempt to become Soma's apprentice. After being targeted by the Phantom, Hellhound, Nara falls into despair and nearly succumbs to his inner Phantom, Cyclops. While Haruto Soma rescues Nara from both Phantoms, he also destroys Nara's potential for using magic. Despite this, Nara forces himself into Soma's life, intent on supporting him nonetheless. As of the series finale, Nara becomes Shigeru Wajima's apprentice.

Kosuke Nito
 is a young, optimistic archaeologist from the Fukui Prefecture who believes that pinches and chances are two sides of the same coin, possesses a gigantic appetite, and a tendency to put mayonnaise on everything he eats. While on an expedition as a student archaeologist, he found the  belt and broke a seal holding a horde of Ghouls at bay. Forced to become  to defeat the monsters, he learns he unknowingly forged a pact with the Phantom, Beast Chimera, and must now consume other Phantoms for their magical energy to keep Beast Chimera satiated or else he will eat Nito. Despite this, Nito maintains the pact so he can learn more about Phantoms and his newfound powers under the belief that he will never make an important discovery like Beast Chimera again.

In the present, following a misunderstanding over how their respective magic functions during their first meeting, Nito views Haruto Soma as his "eternal rival". Additionally, the former refuses to allow Soma to destroy Beast Chimera, claiming his Phantom is too powerful. While fighting Sou Fueki, Nito breaks the Beast Driver to release Beast Chimera and let him devour the excess magical energy that Fueki's second Sabbath was generating in order to negate it. In appreciation, Beast Chimera spares Nito, frees him of their pact, and takes his leave. Following the Phantoms' defeat, Nito takes on Yuzuru Iijima as an apprentice and goes on a journey to find Beast Chimera again.

During the events of the crossover film Kamen Rider × Kamen Rider Gaim & Wizard: The Fateful Sengoku Movie Battle, Nito eventually succeeds in locating and recapturing Beast Chimera. However, he is forced to renew their pact to confront the Phantom, Ogre. Soma defeats Ogre, but Nito is kidnapped by the Pitcher Plant Monster and taken to another universe. He is later rescued by Soma and Kamen Rider Gaim before assisting them in defeating Kamen Rider Bujin Gaim. Following this, Nito discovers he can feed Beast Chimera Helheim fruits to satiate its appetite as well.

While transformed, he wields the  rapier, which allows him to perform the  finisher. Similarly to Soma, Nito possesses his own series of rings that allow him to access different right shoulder-mounted , which grant different animal-inspired powers.

: An orange-colored Mantle accessed from the  Ring that grants the ability to fly. This Mantle first appears in the film Kamen Rider × Kamen Rider Wizard & Fourze: Movie War Ultimatum.
: A light green-colored Mantle accessed from the  Ring that grants the ability to blend in with the surrounding environment, appear invisible to enemies, and utilize an extendable tongue on the pauldron.
: A crimson-colored Mantle accessed from the  Ring that grants increased strength and durability.
: A purple-colored Mantle accessed from the  Ring that grants increased swimming capabilities and the use of healing spells.

Moreover, Nito can use special rings to access stronger or unique forms.
: Beast's super form accessed from the  Ring that arms him with the  firearm, which allows him to perform the  finisher, as well as extendable tassels and increased speed and agility.
: A special form accessed from Wizard's Land Dragon Ring that equips Beast with the former's Drago Hell Claws. This form appears exclusively in the Hyper Battle DVD special Showtime with the Dance Ring.

Beast Chimera
, or simply , is a chimeric, five-headed non-anthropomorphic lion/falcon/chameleon/buffalo/dolphin-themed Phantom that was sealed within the Beast Driver for millennia. When Nito found the Beast Driver, Chimera formed a pact with the human to spare his life in return for being provided an abundance of magical energy, such as that of other Phantoms', to feed on. Like WizarDragon, Nito can summon Beast Chimera within a Gate's Underworld to help him fight inner Phantoms.

In battle, Beast Chimera possesses leonine claws, can fire  from all five of his heads, and perform the  attack. In the film Kamen Rider Wizard in Magic Land, the Magic Land version of Beast Chimera possesses the ability to transform into a giant set of claws to assist Nito destroying inner Phantoms.

Recurring characters

Sou Fueki
After tasking Haruto Soma with taking care of Koyomi for him, Fueki assumed the identity of the Phantoms' leader, to manipulate them into creating more Phantoms to strengthen Soma's powers while using his White Wizard alias to find three more magicians in the hopes that their and Soma's mana will prove more powerful before initiating a new Sabbath. In preparation for the ritual, Fueki provides Soma with additional Magic Rings to enhance his power further, grants Mayu Inamori the means to transform into Kamen Rider Mage, and brainwashes Yuzuru Iijima and Masahiro Yamamoto into serving him as additional Kamen Rider Mages.

After he kills the Phantom, Medusa, for threatening his plans, Fueki's multiple aliases are exposed and he reveals his true intentions to everyone involved before forcing Soma, Inamori, Iijima, and Yamamoto to become his second Sabbath's power source and using all of Tokyo as a sacrificial site. However, Kosuke Nito and Beast Chimera foil the ritual while Sora Takigawa tricks Fueki into weakening himself before killing him.

Utilizing the  belt in conjunction with the  Ring, Fueki can transform into Kamen Rider Wiseman. While transformed, he possesses his own set of Magic Rings, which allow him to perform enhanced versions of Soma's spells, and wields the flute-like  spear. With his own version of the Kick Strike Ring, he can perform his own version of the Strike Wizard.

Phantoms
The  are mythical creature-themed monsters born from Gates, humans with magical potential who experience true hopelessness. As they possess individual personalities, some seek to turn more Gates into Phantoms on the orders of their leader Wiseman while others pursue their own desires. Additionally, some Phantoms embody the dark aspects of their Gate's personality and as such, either behave in an opposite manner or retain their original personality. Along with unique individual abilities, Phantoms can also assume the form of the human they were spawned from.

Medusa
 is a cruel and calculating Phantom born from high school student , who was among the people that Sou Fueki abducted for his first Sabbath. She displays undying loyalty to Wiseman and takes great offense to any Phantom who refuses to carry out their mission, even going so far as to execute them. She also rarely takes part in combat unless she deems it necessary or is forced to. While attempting to infiltrate a high school and target a student named Takako, Medusa learns of her original self's twin sister Mayu Inamori and attempts to create a Phantom from her instead, only to contribute to Mayu becoming a witch and develop a rivalry with her. However, this and Medusa discovering Wiseman's true intentions leads to him killing her.

In her human form, Medusa can see into Gates' personal Underworlds and fire eye beams. In her Phantom form, she wields the  scepter, can utilize magic, use her hair to siphon magic, and petrify opponents.

Phoenix
 is a Phantom born from florist assistant , who was among the people that Fueki abducted for his first Sabbath. Unlike his original self, Phoenix is an arrogant berserker with a fiery temper and love of violence. This led to him killing a Gate by mistake and being forced to become an observer for his fellow Phantoms, though he behaves in an overbearing manner towards them. Due to Haruto Soma's interference, Phoenix convinces Wiseman to let him stop the wizard, only to be defeated and vow revenge. Phoenix goes on to battle Soma several times until Wiseman forbids him from doing so due to his constant losses against Soma. In response, Phoenix attacks drunkards in his human form, attracts Rinko Daimon's attention, and befriends her since she only knew of him in his Phantom form. After she suggests he act on his own whim, he enlists Sora Takigawa to help him settle his rivalry with Soma. During their final battle, the wizard sends Phoenix hurtling into the sun, which traps the Phantom in an endless loop of dying and resurrection that consumes his mana before he can fully regenerate.

In battle, Phoenix wields the  broadsword, can control hellfire, and revive from any attack that would be fatal to other Phantoms with more power than he previously possessed.
 	

Sora Takigawa
While Takigawa was turned into the Phantom , he retained his original personality, acts on his own whims, and refers to most Phantoms by their Gates' names. Motivated by a desire to fight Haruto Soma at his full power and to know Wiseman's full plan, Takigawa secretly provides Soma with additional magic stones through his allies and assists Phoenix in his final battle with Soma before taking Phoenix's place as an observer for other Phantoms to get closer to Wiseman. After gaining Wiseman's trust, Takigawa becomes his right hand.

Takigawa eventually reveals his unique nature to Soma in an attempt to convince him of their similarities but is disappointed when Soma discovers his history as a human. Following this, Takigawa attempts to make himself human again by planting the idea of investigating Sou Fueki into Soma's mind and making several attempts to kidnap Koyomi to retrieve the Philosopher's Stone from her body. When Kosuke Nito foils Fueki's second Sabbath, Takigawa tricks the latter into weakening himself before killing him to extract the Philosopher's Stone from Koyomi and absorb it. However, he inadvertently evolves his Phantom form and resolves to amass more magical energy through senseless death and destruction, leading Haruto to confirm that Takigawa had since abandoned his humanity prior to the Sabbath. The latter is ultimately defeated by Kamen Rider Wizard, who removes the Philosopher's Stone from Takigawa before killing him.

In his Phantom form, Takigawa wields the twin scissor-like  swords and possesses superhuman speed.

Ghouls
The  are stone imp-like lesser Phantoms capable of either converting their arms into gun-like weapons that shoot hellfire or wielding polearms that the stronger Phantoms can summon to serve as foot soldiers. While they are weaker than regular Phantoms, Ghouls can withstand gunfire.

Minor Phantoms
He targets Rinko Daimon, only to be destroyed by Kamen Rider Wizard.
: A giant, non-anthropomorphic inner Phantom with wings, six spear-like legs, and the ability to fire balls of electricity from its mouth. It resides in Rinko Daimon's Underworld until Kamen Rider Wizard destroys it.
: A Phantom born from morning news announcer  with pyromancy, shadow magic, and the  motorcycle. He targets Shunpei Nara, only to be destroyed by Kamen Rider Wizard.
: A giant inner Phantom that possesses incredible strength, claws, and a spiked club. It resides in Shunpei Nara's Underworld until Kamen Rider Wizard destroys it.
: A cowardly Phantom born from an unnamed African man with adept combat capabilities, sharp claws, and the ability to turn his arms into golden blades. Medusa forces him to target pianist . However, he is foiled and destroyed by Kamen Rider Wizard.
: A Phantom born from an unnamed sommelier who wields a trident and possesses burrowing capabilities. He is assigned to target scam artist , only to be foiled and destroyed by Kamen Rider Wizard. Gnome is portrayed by 
: A Phantom born from an unnamed worker with the ability to petrify himself, which he can use defensively and offensively. He targets Naoki Katayama, only to be destroyed by Kamen Rider Wizard. In the Hyper Battle DVD special Showtime with the Dance Ring, a new version of Gargoyle appears in Yu Kamimura's Underworld, only to be destroyed by Kamen Riders Wizard and Beast.
: A giant, non-anthropomorphic inner Phantom that possesses the ability to fire purple fireballs from its singular eye and multiple tentacles. It resides in Naoki Katayama's Underworld until Kamen Rider Wizard destroys it.
: A male Phantom born from  who wields a spear, can fly, and fire energy darts from his forehead. He targets struggling wagashi shop owner , only to be foiled and destroyed by Kamen Rider Wizard.
: A Phantom born from film director , who was among the people that Sou Fueki kidnapped for his first Sabbath, that possesses a thick hide and wields the  sword. Following a failed attempt on Haruto Soma's life during the Sabbath, Lizardman goes on the run from Phoenix and Medusa, not wanting anything to do with their mission. While in his human form, he comes into Soma's care and meets , an actress who worked with his Gate. However, Medusa finds Lizardman and forces him to kill Soma and target Manaka. Ultimately, Kamen Rider Wizard foils and destroys Lizardman.
: A giant inner Phantom that possesses incredible strength, six arms, two spears, a sword, and an axe. Phoenix attempts to free it from the Underworld of a man named , only for Kamen Rider Wizard to destroy it.
: A Phantom born from an unnamed fortune teller who is adept in combat and possesses a poisonous tail stinger. Wiseman sends him to target Kosuke Nito, only to be destroyed by Nito as Kamen Rider Beast. Manticore is portrayed .
: A Phantom born from an unnamed diver who wields a spear and possesses increased swimming capabilities and several extendable tentacles. He targets artist , only to be defeated by Kamen Rider Wizard.
: A giant, non-anthropomorphic inner Phantom with strong physical capabilities and agility, flight, and the ability to split off segments of its body into smaller versions of itself. It resides in Hiroshi Oikawa's Underworld until Kamen Rider Beast destroys it.
: A sadistic Phantom born from an unnamed conductor who can manipulate space-time, teleport, control human minds, and wields a sword capable of firing light needles. He targets housewife , only to be foiled and destroyed by Kamen Rider Wizard. Beelzebub is portrayed by IZAM.
: A Phantom born from self-proclaimed "muscular man"  who possesses superhuman strength, a sword, and the ability to fire energy balls from his pectorals. He targets Kosuke Nito's no-nonsense grandmother , only to be foiled by Kamen Rider Wizard and destroyed by Kamen Rider Beast.
: A Phantom born from an unnamed security officer who is armed with the  sword,  shield, and upper back-mounted cannons. He targets archaeologist , only to be foiled and destroyed by Kamen Rider Beast.
: A Phantom born from a man called  who is armed with a double-bladed polearm capable of opening anyone's Underworlds. Due to Legion's insatiable desire to attack and destroy any human he deems has a "beautiful heart", Wiseman locked him away in a cave. However, Sora Takigawa frees Legion, who goes on a rampage until he is destroyed by Kamen Rider Wizard.
: A Phantom born a man called  who possesses intangibility, the ability to summon spirits capable of giving people bad luck and reviving him, and wields a lance. He targets six Gates, only to be foiled and destroyed by Kamen Rider Beast.
: A Phantom born from a man called  capable of producing a blinding flash that can temporarily blind people and the use of puppet eyes that can attack from multiple directions via light bolts. He targets popular model, only to be foiled by Takigawa and destroyed by Kamen Rider Beast.
: A Phantom born from a man called  with superhuman speed, a spear, and the ability to turn into a talking myna bird. He targets  by framing him for arson, only to be destroyed by Kamen Rider Wizard. Raum is portrayed by  while Yuki Anai voices his bird form.
: A Phantom born from a man called  with strong physical capabilities, sharp arm and leg blades, and the ability to produce an energy blade from his arms. He targets amateur soccer player and Haruto Soma's former teammate, only to be foiled and destroyed by Kamen Rider Wizard.
: A male Phantom born from a man called  with aeromancy, flight, and a halberd. He targets Yuzuru Iijima, only to be foiled by the latter and defeated by Kamen Riders Wizard and Beast.
: A riddle-obsessed Phantom born from a man called  who possesses pyromancy and wields a baton. He targets  while the latter is attempting to find Koyomi after she gave him a ring years prior, only to be destroyed by Kamen Rider Beast.
: A giant, non-anthropomorphic inner Phantom capable of levitating and creating energy chains. It resides in Masafumi Saionji's Underworld until Kamen Rider Wizard destroys it.
: A Phantom born from a woman called  who possesses aeromancy and a spear. She targets Haruto Soma's elementary school teacher , only to be foiled by Kamen Riders Wizard and Beast and destroyed by the former.
: A male Phantom born from an unnamed, unseen Gate who possesses a durable exoskeleton, claws, an axe, superhuman speed, and the ability to merge with the ground. He is destroyed by Kamen Riders Wizard and Beast.

Other Phantoms
Carbuncle: Artificial Phantoms created by Sou Fueki, with one of them being absorbed into the former so he can transform into Kamen Rider Wiseman. In the crossover film Kamen Rider × Kamen Rider Gaim & Wizard: The Fateful Sengoku Movie Battle, three dormant Carbuncles are awakened during the National Security Bureau Section Zero's investigation of one of Fueki's old hideouts before Ogre absorbs the Phantoms to gain their powers. Ogre later summons the Carbuncles to distract Kosuke Nito during his quest to devour WizarDragon.
: A Phantom born from an unnamed, unseen Magic Land Gate who appears exclusively in the film Kamen Rider Wizard in Magic Land. He leads a group of Ghouls in attacking Magic Land inhabitants, only to be destroyed by the Magic Land versions of Shunpei Nara, Yu Kamimura, and Rinko Daimon.
Drake creates Magic Land and manipulates its ruler, Maya, as part of a plot to create Phantoms from magicians, only to be killed by Kamen Rider Wizard.
: A non-anthropomorphic inner Phantom that resides in Shiina's Underworld until Kamen Riders Wizard and Beast destroy it. This Phantom appears exclusively in the film Kamen Rider Wizard in Magic Land.
: A cannibalistic Phantom born from a man called  who thrives on consuming other Phantoms for their abilities and appears exclusively in the crossover film Kamen Rider × Kamen Rider Gaim & Wizard: The Fateful Sengoku Movie Battle. In an attempt to devour WizarDragon, Ogre steals the Philosopher's Stone from Haruto Soma and uses it to create a copy of Koyomi. The Phantom succeeds in entering Soma's Underworld, but is defeated by Soma and WizarDragon.

Shigeru Wajima
Wajima initially did not make rings out of fear of hurting people until he met Soma, who renewed the ring maker's resolve and became inspired to help Soma.

Masanori Kizaki
 is the superintendent of the Tokyo Metropolitan Police Department's  branch who secretly investigates Kamen Rider Wizard and the Phantoms, seeing both as abominations. Six months prior, he and his partner Katayama discovered the Phantoms' existence while investigating mass disappearances and lost Katayama to the Phantom, Gargoyle. Ever since, Kizaki looked after Katayama's son, Naoki. After working with Wizard to save Naoki, Kizaki becomes an ally to him and goes on to discover and tell him the White Wizard's true identity.

Yu Kamimura
 is the effeminate, gay manager of the  food truck who dresses in drag. He sees Haruto Soma as his favorite customer and comes up with countless new flavors and styles of doughnuts for him, only to be stymied when Soma asks for his usual order of plain sugar doughnuts.

During the events of the crossover film Kamen Rider × Kamen Rider Wizard & Fourze: Movie War Ultimatum, Kamimura is kidnapped by the Akumaizer due to his status as a Gate and trapped in a machine that utilizes his mana, along with that of four children, to create an army of monsters. After ending up in Kamimura's Underworld, Soma helps him move past his fantasies, rescue the trapped children, and work together to defeat the Akumaizer.

Of the role, Kaba-chan stated that while she never really watched Kamen Rider as a child, she felt that she would form great memories as a member of the Kamen Rider Wizard cast. This role made her the first LGBT cast member and regular character in the history of the Kamen Rider franchise.

Kamen Rider Mage
 is the collective name for a mass-produced Rider form utilized by most magicians. First appearing in the film Kamen Rider Wizard in Magic Land, all magically-powered inhabitants of Magic Land possess the ability to transform into a variation of Kamen Rider Mage depending on their societal role. In the series, Sou Fueki uses three versions of Kamen Rider Mage to serve as a power source for his second Sabbath ritual.

Additionally, the film versions wield the broom-like  spear, which can be used for offensive and transportation purposes.

Mayu Inamori
 is the younger twin sister of Misa Inamori, Medusa's original self. After losing her sister and parents while studying abroad, Mayu returns to Japan, eventually encounters Medusa, and learns the Phantom killed her parents. Despite falling into despair, Mayu recalls a memory of Misa telling her only she can decide her fate and suppresses her inner Phantom. As a result, Mayu becomes a witch and accepts the White Wizard's offer to hone her skills so she can hunt Phantoms and avenge her family.

Sometime later, Mayu returns to fight Medusa as an amber version of Kamen Rider Mage. After several battles with Medusa however, Mayu discovers the White Wizard's true identity and intentions and sides with Haruto Soma to stop him. Following the Phantoms' defeat, Mayu joins the Toriizaka Police Station under Rinko Daimon.

Unlike other versions of Kamen Rider Mage, Mayu also wields her own version of the WizarSwordGun and the  Ring, which allows her to destroy most Phantoms.

Mayu Inamori is portrayed by Erina Nakayama, who also portrays Medusa and Misa Inamori.

Yuzuru Iijima
 is a boy who wanted to make amends with his friend  for getting her in trouble after stealing her bike in an attempt to learn how to ride one. While being targeted by the Phantom Sylphi, Iijima gets Kosuke Nito to teach him how to ride a bike. While Iijima falls into despair after Sylphi manipulates him into injuring Kurata, her voice inspires the boy to suppress his inner Phantom. Iijima decides not to become a wizard, but Sou Fueki kidnaps and brainwashes him into becoming a blue version of Kamen Rider Mage in order to kidnap Mayu Inamori and become a power source for his second Sabbath ritual. When Nito succeeds in foiling Fueki's plans, Iijima is freed from the latter's control and later becomes Nito's apprentice.

Masahiro Yamamoto
 is a father-to-be who was attacked by the Phantom, Arachne, while purchasing baby items for his pregnant wife, Aya Yamamoto. After discovering he is a Gate, Haruto Soma and his allies bring Masahiro to the antiques shop Omokagedō for protection, but Masahiro becomes distraught when he learns he cannot contact his wife. Kosuke Nito leads the search for Aya, but Arachne finds her first. While Nito fights the Phantom, Medusa takes advantage by attacking and seemingly killing Aya to make Masahiro fall into despair. Upon learning Soma protected Aya at the last minute, Masahiro overcomes his despair and suppresses his inner Phantom, only to be kidnapped, brainwashed, and turned into a green version of Kamen Rider Mage by Sou Fueki for his Sabbath ritual. While under Fueki's control, Masahiro fights Soma and his allies before serving as a power source for the Sabbath until Nito foils Fueki's plans, freeing Masahiro in the process. Masahiro initially attempts to return to his family, but Aya convinces him to help Soma, Nito, and their allies stop Sora Takigawa. Following Takigawa's defeat, Masahiro's son is born.

Guest characters
: A mother-to-be and Masahiro's wife.
: An evil wizard who can perform magic without a Driver and call out spells to invoke their effect without a ring. Amadum seeks to break out by stealing the Heisei Riders' powers and using the Magic Stone world's version of Haruto Soma so he can exact revenge on the world. However, he is defeated by Kamen Riders Wizard and Gaim and their Heisei Rider predecessors.
The Boy: A young, orphan version of Haruto who resides within the World Within the Magic Stone, but desires to break out and save his version of Koyomi. He initially distrusts the "primary" version of Soma, but later helps him defeat Amadum. Following this, the Boy learns he might become a Kamen Rider instead of a monster and is entrusted with Soma's Infinity Ring.
Koyomi: The "World Within the Magic Stone's" version of Koyomi who is on the verge of becoming a monster. The "World Within the Magic Stone" version of Koyomi is portrayed by SALA.
: A nomadic photographer from an alternate universe and one of Soma's Heisei Rider predecessors who is capable of transforming into . Kadoya and the other Riders who preceded Soma are trapped in the World Within the Magic Stone until Soma joins forces with them and Kamen Rider Gaim to defeat Amadum and escape.
: An Armored Rider from Zawame City who hears the Boy's cries for help, enters the World Within the Magic Stone, and joins forces with Soma and their Rider predecessors to defeat Amadum.

Spin-off exclusive characters
Additionally, they joined forces with psychic Kageto Banba, who created the Zeber device five years in the future to gather psychic energy so the Akumaizer can use it on Yu Kamimura's Underworld and flood the human world with humanity-killing magic. Despite their best efforts, the Akumaizer are ultimately defeated and killed by Kamen Riders Wizard, Fourze, OOO, and their allies.
: The leader of the Akumaizer who can utilize Kamimura's Underworld's magic, wields the  Jankel, and possesses mind control and an armored car that he later transforms into the flying warship  via the Zeber's power.
: The most agile and skilled fighter of the Akumaizer who wields the  Jankel and possesses proficiency in aerial combat and the ability to travel through time.
: Surviving members of the original Shocker terrorist organization who Strategist Raider empowered with magic to aid him in resurrecting Demon King Psycho, only to be destroyed before they can realize their dream, and appear exclusively in the film Kamen Rider × Super Sentai × Space Sheriff: Super Hero Taisen Z.
: A mystic who offered his services to the Space Crime Syndicate Madou before he was killed for attempting to take over the organization. After being revived by unknown means, Raider recruits Space Shocker to help him revive Psycho in order to consume the universe. Despite being killed once more by Kamen Rider Wizard and Kyoryu Red, Raider is revived as the monstrous  before he is killed permanently by Kamen Rider Beast and Kyoryu Gold.
: Space Shocker's squid-like commander who oversees the capture of Psycholon, only to be killed by the Gokaigers via the Metal Heroes' powers.
: A spider-like commander of Space Shocker who dons a celestial cloak and aids in the capture of Psycholon before he is killed by Kamen Rider Fourze and Inazuman.
: The leader of the Space Crime Syndicate Madou who intended to conquer the universe through chaos decades ago before Sharivan defeated it. After Raider brings the castle to Earth, Psycho is resurrected, only to be killed permanently by the Space Sheriffs, the Kyoryugers, and Kamen Rider Wizard.
: The ruler of Magic Land who appears exclusively in the film Kamen Rider Wizard in Magic Land. Unlike the other residents of Magic Land, he possesses no magic power despite possessing a wizard's belt and Wizard Ring. In the real world, he is a happily married man with a wife and baby.
: A young boy and resident of Magic Land who Shigeru Wajima took in as his apprentice when the former's mother was taken by a rainbow tornado and appears exclusively in the film Kamen Rider Wizard in Magic Land. After Kamen Riders Wizard and Beast kill Shiina's inner Phantom, the non-anthropomorphic Ouroboros, they negate the boy's ability to use magic.
: An ancient wizard who practices black magic, was executed by the ancient followers of science, had his soul placed in a mirror, and appears exclusively in the Kamen Rider Wizard tie-in novel. Sometime after Sou Fueki's death, Warlock senses the Philosopher's Stone in Haruto Soma's possession and escapes the mirror in the hopes of using the stone's power to reshape the world in his image. After failing to use a homunculus to grab the stone, Warlock creates Another Haruto and pits him against the original before successfully stealing the Philosopher's Stone. When the clone grows as strong as the original however, Warlock possesses Rinko Daimon's body and uses a Ghoul to transform into a serpentine Phantom in an attempt to kill her and bring both Harutos to despair. Nonetheless, both Harutos merge together and defeat Warlock.
: A clone that Warlock created from the negative side of the original Haruto's mind who appears exclusively in the Kamen Rider Wizard tie-in novel. He initially transforms into , before gradually absorbing mana from his opponent so he can assume Wizard's other forms. Warlock pits the Harutos against each other as part of his plot to steal the Philosopher's Stone, but the original Haruto acknowledges his fear of losing loved ones and merges with Another Haruto, which charges the Philosopher's Stone with enough energy to destroy Warlock.

Notes

References

Wizard characters
Characters
Kamen Rider Wizard
Kamen Rider Wizard